Fernando Rodríguez Trueba (born 18 January 1955), known as Fernando Trueba, is a Spanish book editor, screenwriter, film director and producer.

Between 1974 and 1979, he worked as a film critic for Spain's leading daily newspaper El País. In 1980, he founded the monthly film magazine Casablanca, which he edited and directed during its first two years. He is the author of Diccionario (Planeta 1997, Plot 2004, Galaxia Guttenberg 2006) and the editor of Diccionario del Jazz Latino (SGAE, 1998).

Among other awards, he has won the Oscar for Best Foreign Language Film with Belle Époque in 1994, the Goya Award as Best Director three times and a Silver Bear for Year of Enlightment at the 37th Berlin International Film Festival. Miracle of Candeal won the Goya for Best Documentary, and Chico and Rita won the Goya for Best Feature Animation. In 1999, The Girl of Your Dreams was nominated for the Golden Bear at the 49th Berlin International Film Festival. In 2011 he won the Award of the Hungarian National Student Jury for Chico and Rita at the 7th Festival of European Animated Feature Films and TV Specials.

As a music producer he has won two Grammy Awards and four Latin Grammy Awards.

He is the elder brother of David Trueba. He is married to producer , and he is the father of director Jonás Trueba.

Filmography

Film

Producer only

Short Film

Documentary

Television

Discography as music producer
 2000: Calle 54 (Soundtrack)
 2002: Lágrimas Negras (Bebo & Cigala')
 2003: We Could Make Such Beautiful Music Together (Bebo Valdés & Federico Britos)
 2004: Bebo de Cuba (Bebo Valdés)
 2005: Bebo (Bebo Valdés)
 2006: Paz  (Niño Josele)
 2007: Live at the Village Vanguard (Bebo Valdés & Javier Colina)
 2008: Juntos Para Siempre (Bebo Valdés & Chucho Valdés)
 2009: Caribe - Michel Camilo Big Band  (Michel Camilo)
 2010: Española (Niño Josele)

References

External links

 
 Official web by Trueba 
 Fernando Trueba Productions web

1955 births
Living people
Spanish screenwriters
Spanish male writers
Male screenwriters
Directors of Best Foreign Language Film Academy Award winners
Grammy Award winners
European Film Awards winners (people)
Best Director Goya Award winners
Film directors from Madrid
Film producers from Madrid
Writers from Madrid
21st-century Spanish screenwriters